The Tschuggen is a mountain of the Bernese Alps, overlooking Wengen in the Bernese Oberland. It has an elevation of 2,521 metres above sea level and it is the highest summit of the group lying north of the Kleine Scheidegg.

References

External links
 Tschuggen on Hikr

Mountains of the Alps
Mountains of Switzerland
Mountains of the canton of Bern
Two-thousanders of Switzerland